Sid Ali Lakroum (born 6 October 1987) is an Algerian international footballer who plays as a striker.

Club career
Lakroum has played club football for WA Boufarik, CR Belouizdad, ES Sétif and Al-Qaisumah. In 2019 he signed for Olympique de Médéa. On 19 February 2021 he signed for Al-Markhiya. On 19 February 2021 he signed for Olympique de Médéa. He signed for Al-Qaisumah in January 2022.

On 25 August 2022, Lakroum joined Saudi club Al-Nahda.

International career
He made his international debut for Algeria in 2018.

References

1987 births
Living people
Algerian footballers
Algerian expatriate footballers
Algeria international footballers
WA Boufarik players
CR Belouizdad players
ES Sétif players
Al-Qaisumah FC players
Al-Nahda Club (Saudi Arabia) players
Olympique de Médéa players
Al-Markhiya SC players
Algerian Ligue Professionnelle 1 players
Saudi First Division League players
Qatari Second Division players
Association football forwards
Algerian expatriate sportspeople in Saudi Arabia
Algerian expatriate sportspeople in Qatar
Expatriate footballers in Saudi Arabia
Expatriate footballers in Qatar
21st-century Algerian people